Jan Wilhelm Malmsjö (born 29 May 1932) is a Swedish stage and film actor, musical star and singer. He is married to Marie Göranzon and father to Jonas Malmsjö.

Biography 
Malmsjö was born in Lund, Sweden.  He trained at the prestigious Royal Dramatic Training Academy from 1950 to 1953 and one of his first parts on the national stage was as Paris in Shakespeare's Romeo and Juliet (1953).

He appeared in two episodes of the World War II drama Combat! in 1966, first on the fourth season episode "Sudden Terror" as Bruener and secondly on the fifth season episode "The Chapel at Able Five" as Captain Krauss. In the same year he played Ilya W. Vorchek in the episode "Agent of the East" of the World War II espionage series Blue Light.

Malmsjö has a great range as an actor from the title role in Shakespeare's Hamlet (Dramaten, 1974) and Reverent Manders in Ibsen's Ghosts to Henry Higgins in My Fair Lady and leading roles in other musicals such as La Cage aux Folles and Victor/Victoria. He has also cut several music records in his native Sweden. In the musical world, his Swedish language recording of "Willkommen"; Välkomna till Cabaret (from Malmö City Theatre's successful production of Cabaret 1970; where Malmsjö played the part of Emcee) is considered a masterpiece and treasure on CD.

He has filmed sporadically: one of his most famous film parts is as the Bishop Edvard Vergérus in Ingmar Bergman's Fanny and Alexander (1982). One of his more recent stage parts was as The Captain in Strindberg's The Dance of Death in the 1993 Dramaten-production, directed by Lars Norén (adapted for TV in 1996).

He also voiced Lumiere in the Swedish dub of Disney's Beauty and the Beast.

In December 2007, Malmsjö participated in the Swedish reality show Stjärnorna på slottet (Stars at the Castle), at Trolleholm Castle, along with Peter Stormare, Arja Saijonmaa, Britt Ekland and Magnus Härenstam.
He participated in Melodifestivalen 2019 with the song "Leva Livet".

Malmsjö was still acting as recently as 2017 at the age of 85, when he was rehearsing the title role of Krapp's Last Tape by Samuel Beckett, at Stockholm's Royal Dramatic Theatre. In early 2019, he was one of the contestants (in a preparatory heat) for Sweden's selection for the Eurovision Song Contest; last time he appeared in the show had been fifty years before.

Personal life 
Malmsjö is married to actress and colleague of the Royal Dramatic Theatre, Marie Göranzon. His son, Jonas Malmsjö, is also an actor (and acted opposite his father in Ingmar Bergman's staging of The Ghost Sonata by August Strindberg, in 2000).

Awards 
In 1972, Malmsjö was awarded Svenska Dagbladet's Thalia Prize. He was awarded the Litteris et Artibus and Illis quorum in 1986 and the Eugene O'Neill Award in 1988. He received the Guldmasken in 1997, 1999, 2004, and 2009.

Selected filmography 
 1959 –  (a.k.a. The Imaginary Invalid) (TV theatre)
 1959 – Pojken Winslow (a.k.a. The Winslow Boy) (TV theatre)
 1960 – The Die Is Cast
 1960 – Mälarpirater (aka, Pirates on the Malonen)
 1962 – The Lady in White
 1963 – Hide and Seek 
 1964 – Älskande par (aka, Loving Couples)
 1966 – Torn Curtain (in final scene of this Hitchcock movie) – Swedish Photographer (uncredited)
 1973 – Scenes from a Marriage
 1975 – [[Release the Prisoners to Spring|Släpp fångarne loss, det är vår!]] 1980 – Marmalade Revolution 1982 – Fanny and Alexander 1986 – Peter the Great (miniseries)
 1986 –  (mini series)
 1987 – Jim & Piraterna Blom (a.k.a. Jim and the Pirates)
 1993 – Drömkåken (a.k.a. The Dream House)
 1996 – Dödsdansen (TV-theatre, SVT)
 1997 – Jag är din krigare
 1998 – Den tatuerade änkan (TV)
 2006 –  – Walter
 2006 – Beck – Den japanska shungamålningen – Ernst Levendahl
 2007 –  – Eckelstein
 2013 –  (2013) – Axel Frankel

Singles

Photographs 
 Jan Malmsjö as Hummel in Strindberg's "Ghost Sonata", directed by Ingmar Bergman (2000; left Gunnel Lindblom as The Mummy)
 Jan Malmsjö in the 1970s
 Jan Malmsjö – 2001 portrait
 Jan Malmsjö as Manders in "Ghosts" by Henrik Ibsen (left: Pernilla August as Mrs. Alving)
 Photo from Dramaten.se

References

External links 
 
 

1932 births
Eugene O'Neill Award winners
Litteris et Artibus recipients
Living people
People from Lund
Swedish male film actors
Swedish male musical theatre actors
Swedish male singers
Swedish male television actors
Recipients of the Illis quorum
Melodifestivalen contestants of 2019